Kurixalus lenquanensis is a species of frog in the genus Kurixalus and can be found specifically in regions of Gejiu.

References 

lenquanensis
Frogs of China